The Tagaytay Extreme Sports Complex is a complex of sports facilities in Tagaytay, Philippines capable of hosting BMX cycling and skateboarding events.

History 

The Tagaytay Extreme Sports Complex was built with the intention of hosting events for the 2019 Southeast Asian Games. The project was built by the Department of Public Works and Highways (DWPH) and the Tagaytay city government with WRC Construction as the private contractor. The DWPH has included its skatepark as part of President Rodrigo Duterte's Build! Build! Build! infrastructure program. It was completed on December 17, 2019, with construction taking three months to finish. The sports venue was able to host the cycling and skateboarding events of the  2019 Southeast Asian Games.

The sports venue was closed in early 2020 due to community quarantine measures imposed in response to the COVID-19 pandemic. It was briefly opened to the public in September 2020 but was closed again. By September 2021, the skatepark's street section has become dilapidated.

Facilities 
The sports complex has a track oval, a BMX trail and a skatepark. The skate park has two main sections, the street section built at the center of the oval and the bowl which was built beside the BMX trail.

References 

Sports complexes in the Philippines
Buildings and structures in Tagaytay
Skateparks
BMX tracks
2019 establishments in the Philippines
Sports venues completed in 2019